Lipovy Klyuch (Yükäle Şişmä) is a rural locality (a village) in Verkhnebishindinsky Selsoviet, Tuymazinsky District, Bashkortostan, Russia. The population was 84 as of 2010. There are 2 streets.

Geography 
Lipovy Klyuch is located 18 km southeast of Tuymazy (the district's administrative centre) by road. Nizhniye Bishindy is the nearest rural locality.

References 

Rural localities in Tuymazinsky District